Željko Kovačević (Serbian Cyrillic: Жељко Ковачевић; born 30 October 1981) is a Serbian professional footballer who plays as a defender.

Statistics

Honours
Rabotnički
 Macedonian First League: 2007–08
 Macedonian Cup: 2007–08

External links
 HLSZ profile
 

Association football defenders
Expatriate footballers in Bosnia and Herzegovina
Expatriate footballers in Hungary
Expatriate footballers in North Macedonia
First League of Serbia and Montenegro players
FK Borac Čačak players
FK Rabotnički players
FK Slavija Sarajevo players
FK Smederevo players
FK Vardar players
Nemzeti Bajnokság I players
Nyíregyháza Spartacus FC players
Serbian expatriate footballers
Serbian expatriate sportspeople in Bosnia and Herzegovina
Serbian expatriate sportspeople in Hungary
Serbian expatriate sportspeople in North Macedonia
Serbian footballers
Serbian SuperLiga players
Sportspeople from Čačak
1981 births
Living people